Ridolfi is an Italian surname. Notable people with the surname include:

 Achille Ridolfi (born 1979), Belgian stage and film actor
 Andrea Ridolfi (born 1963), Italian musician, composer and orchestra director
 Antonio Ridolfi (1824-1900), Italian painter
 Carlo Ridolfi (1594–1658), Italian art biographer and painter of the Baroque period
 Claudio Ridolfi (1560–1644), Italian painter of the Renaissance period
 Federica Ridolfi (born 1974), Italian dancer and a hostess on television
 Ludovico Ridolfi (1587–1649), Roman Catholic prelate who served as Bishop of Patti 
 Michele Ridolfi (1795–1854), Italian painter and art critic
 Niccolò Ridolfi (1501–1550), Italian cardinal
 Niccolò Ridolfi (Dominican), Italian Master of the Order of Preachers from 1629 to 1642
 Ottavio Ridolfi (1582–1624), Roman Catholic cardinal
 Pietro Ridolfi (bishop) (died 1601), Roman Catholic prelate who served as Bishop of Senigallia and of Venosa
 Pietro Ridolfi (active 1710–1716), Italian engraver of the late-Baroque period
 Roberto Ridolfi, or di Ridolfo (1531–1612), Italian and Florentine nobleman and conspirator
 Sido L. Ridolfi (1913–2004), American Democratic Party politician

Other
 Palazzo Ridolfi-Dalisca, Verona, historical palace located in Verona, northern Italy
 Ridolfi plot, plot in 1571 to assassinate Queen Elizabeth I of England and replace her with Mary, Queen of Scots

Italian-language surnames